Thorsten Marschner (born 17 November 1968) is a retired German high jumper.

He finished eighth at the 1994 European Indoor Championships, and won the bronze medal for his club LG Frankfurt at the 1993 German indoor championships.

His personal best outdoors was 2.28 metres, achieved in July 1988 in Neubrandenburg. Indoors, he achieved 2.30 metres in January 1989 in Senftenberg.

References

1968 births
Living people
German male high jumpers